Kanni Raasi is a 2020 Indian Tamil-language romantic comedy film directed by Muthukumaran and produced by Shameem Ibraham. The film stars Vimal and Varalaxmi Sarathkumar, with Pandiarajan, Yogi Babu, Kaali Venkat and Robo Shankar amongst others in supporting roles.

Plot
The film is about the protagonist's aversion to a love marriage, that is not shared by the heroine, his neighbour.

Cast

Vimal as Gemini Ganesan
Varalaxmi Sarathkumar as Anjali 
Pandiarajan as Thiruvengadam
Yogi Babu as Vairamani
Robo Shankar as Manmadhan
Kaali Venkat as Jaishankar
Chaams as Ambur Ram Iyer
Bava Lakshmanan as Head Constable
Valavan as Sengottai Perumal
Lollu Sabha Manohar as Swamy
P. V. Chandramouli as DSP Ukkira Pandian. Anjali's father
Charmila as Lakshmi
Shakeela as Chechi
Porali Dileepan as Sathasivam
Bhanumathi as Fathima Sathasivam
Jayachandran as Saravanan
Sowmiya as Rosy Saravanan
Arputhan Vijayan as Shanmugam
Prithvi as Shanmugam's wife
Sabbita Roi as Sumathi
Lakshmi Priya Menon as Anjali's mother
Scissor Manohar as Marriage Broker Ramadoss
Kadhal Saravanan as Dhobi
Nanjil Vijayan as Vairamani's sidekick
Anisha Seena as a bride
Arundhati Nair in a special appearance

Production
In November 2015, it was reported that actor Jiiva would work with newcomer Muthukumar for a romantic comedy film titled Gemini Ganesan. P. T. Selvakumar and Shibu Thameens were announced as the film's producers, and they cast Sathyaraj, Lissy and Rajendra Prasad amongst others in pivotal roles. Tamannaah was first choice to play the lead actress, but her unavailability meant that Lakshmi Menon replaced her. However, the failure of the producers' Puli (2015) and their collaboration with Jiiva in Pokkiri Raja, meant that they chose to drop the project.

The film was revived with a new producer in June 2017 and Vimal was cast to play the male lead, and Varalaxmi Sarathkumar was signed on to play the female lead. The makers also chose to change the films title from Gemini Ganesan to Kadhal Mannan, a moniker often associated with the actor Gemini Ganesan. In January 2018, after a major portion of the shoot was completed, the team renamed the film to Kanni Raasi.

Soundtrack
Soundtrack was composed by Vishal Chandrasekhar.
Un Kitta Ennamo Irukku - Sathya Prakash & Kalyaninair
Kannane - K. S. Chithra
Kutti Kutti Chellam Master - Velu & Dhivya pbs

Critical reception
The Times of India wrote "Kanni Rasi is an example of how an incoherent screenplay could test the patience of viewers despite having an unusual plot which had enough scope to entertain audiences." The Indian Express wrote "With films like Kanni Raasi, you don’t even need to wait for the intermission to get your snack. You can do this even during the film, and not miss much."

References

2020 films
2020s Tamil-language films
Indian romantic comedy films
2020 romantic comedy films